The Tomb of National Heroes (also ) in Ljubljana, Slovenia is a tomb and a monument for the national heroes of the World War II resistance struggle in Slovenia, created in 1949. The designers of the tomb and the monument were the architect Edo Mihevc and the sculptor Boris Kalin. It stands next to Šubic Street, at the southern side of National Heroes Square, west of the National Assembly Building. It has been protected as a cultural monument of local significance.

The tomb is located underground, and a monument in the shape of a sarcophagus stands beside it, in the shade of the trees on the western side of the National Assembly Building. Since it was installed, the monument has been modified several times and placed on a granite base. The eastern and western faces of the sarcophagus are covered by bronze reliefs depicting scenes from the Second World War. A patriotic epitaph, written by the poet Oton Župančič, runs along the top edge. It was designed in December 1948 as one of his last works and carved in 1949.

National heroes of Yugoslavia buried in the tomb
Named on the northern face of the sarcophagus
 Tone Tomšič, a.k.a. Gašper (1910–1942), main resistance organizer in Slovenia, arrested and executed by Italian forces
 Slavko Šlander, a.k.a. Aleš (1909–1941), resistance organizer, arrested and executed by German forces
 Miloš Zidanšek, a.k.a. Vencelj (1909–1942), resistance organizer and commander, killed in battle with Italian forces
 Franc Rozman, a.k.a. Stane (1911–1944), head commander of Slovenian partisan units, killed in an accident
 Ivan Kavčič, a.k.a. Nande (1913–1943), resistance commander, killed in battle with Italian forces and the MVAC
Named on the western face of the sarcophagus
 Miha Marinko (1900–1983), resistance commander, later a prominent politician in Slovenia
 Stane Semič, a.k.a. Daki (1915–1985), resistance commander, the first Slovenian recipient of the Order of the National Hero
Named on the eastern face of the sarcophagus
 Edvard Kardelj, a.k.a. Krištof (1910–1979), politician and philosopher, the most influential communist ideologue in Yugoslavia
Named on the southern face of the sarcophagus
 Milovan Šaranović (1913–1943), Montenegrin officer, Slovenian partisan commander
 Dragan Jevtić (1914–1943), Serbian officer, Slovenian partisan commander
 Ljubo Šercer (1915–1941), resistance organizer and commander, arrested and executed by Italian forces
 Janko Premrl, a.k.a. Vojko (1920–1943), resistance commander, mortally wounded in battle
 Majda Šilc (1923–1944), resistance nurse, killed in battle
 Boris Kidrič (1912–1953), resistance politician
 Dušan Kveder, a.k.a. Tomaž (1915–1966), resistance commander, later a diplomat and encyclopedist
 Vinko Simončič, a.k.a. Gašper (1914–1944), resistance commander, killed in battle with German forces

See also
Monuments to the Slovene Partisans

References

Monuments and memorials in Ljubljana
Buildings and structures completed in 1949
Center District, Ljubljana
World War II memorials in Slovenia
Yugoslav World War II monuments and memorials
20th-century architecture in Slovenia